Russell Soaba (born 1950, Tototo, Milne Bay) is a writer from Papua New Guinea, who was educated there, in Australia and in the United States at Brown University. Soaba is one of Papua New Guinea's most prolific writers. He now also works as an editor at Anuki Country Press and a lecturer at the University of Papua New Guinea.

Published works
 1977 Wanpis
 1978 Naked Thoughts: Poems & Illustrations
 1978 How
 1979 Ondobondo Poster Poems
 1979 Maiba
 2000 Kwamra, A Season Of Harvest: Poems

References

External links
Anuki Country Press website

1950 births
Living people
Papua New Guinean writers
Academic staff of the University of Papua New Guinea